The 1937 Irish general election to the 9th Dáil was held on Thursday, 1 July, just over two weeks after the dissolution of the 8th Dáil on 14 June. The general election took place in 34 parliamentary constituencies throughout the Irish Free State for 138 seats in Dáil Éireann. The number of seats in the Dáil was reduced by 15, from 153 to 138 seats, under the Electoral (Revision of Constituencies) Act 1935.

A plebiscite on whether to approve the new Constitution of Ireland was held on the same day. It was approved with the support of 56.5% of voters and would come into force on 29 December 1937.

The 9th Dáil met at Leinster House on 21 July 1937 to elect the President of the Executive Council and approve the appointment of the Executive Council of the Irish Free State. Outgoing president Éamon de Valera was re-elected leading a single-party Fianna Fáil government.

Result

|}

Voting summary

Seats summary

Changes in membership

First time TDs
Ernest Benson
Cormac Breslin
Patrick Browne
Thomas Burke
A. P. Byrne
Michael Colbert
Matthew Davis
John Esmonde
John Friel
Archie Heron
Timothy Linehan
Gerrard McGowan
John Munnelly
Jeremiah Ryan
Laurence Walsh

Re-elected TDs
Patrick Gorry
Joseph Mongan

Defeated TDs
William Broderick
William Browne
Eamonn Cooney
Robert Davitt
Stephen Jordan
James McGuire
James Morrisroe
Patrick Murphy
Patrick O'Dowd
Margaret Mary Pearse
James Reidy

Retiring TDs
Hugh Doherty
Eamon Donnelly
Séamus Keely
Patrick Kehoe
William Kent

Vacancies
Conor Maguire (Resigned on appointment as judge in 1936)

Government formation
Fianna Fáil formed a minority government, the 8th Executive Council of the Irish Free State, with the support of the Labour Party. This became the 1st Government of Ireland on 29 December 1937 on the coming into operation of the Constitution.

Seanad election
After the coming into operation of the Constitution, an election took place under Article 53 of the Constitution for the 2nd Seanad in March 1938.

Notes

References

 
1937 in Irish politics
General election, 1937
1937
9th Dáil
July 1937 events